Modern Fantasy: The 100 Best Novels, An English-Language Selection, 1946–1987 is a nonfiction book written by David Pringle, published by Grafton Books in 1988 in the United Kingdom and the following year by Peter Bedrick Books in the United States. The foreword is by Brian W. Aldiss.

Primarily the book comprises 100 short essays on the selected works, covered in order of publication, without any ranking. It is considered an important critical summary of the field of modern fantasy literature.

Modern Fantasy followed Pringle's Science Fiction: The 100 Best Novels, published by Xanadu in 1985. In the introduction he commends the nearly simultaneous "rival" followup by Xanadu: Stephen Jones and Kim Newman's Horror: The 100 Best Books (Xanadu, 1988).

In fact Xanadu had followed with at least three more books in its 100 Best series: Crime and Mystery in 1987, both Horror and Fantasy in 1988. Xanadu had commissioned Michael Moorcock to write Fantasy, but Moorcock transferred the project to James Cawthorn when it became "clear that [he] would not be able to deliver it for a long time".

According to ISFDB, Pringle's Modern Fantasy was released in October 1988, September 1989 in the U.S.; Xanadu's Fantasy was released in November and published almost simultaneously by Carroll and Graf in the U.S.

Modern fantasy
Pringle says in the introduction, rebutting one academic complaint about the sprawling scope of fantasy, "But it seems to me that fantasy is an indiscriminate form. ... We may even view it as the primal genre, essentially formless, a swamp which has served as the breeding ground for all other popular fiction genres ... Up to the eighteenth century, almost all narrative fictions, both verse and prose, were fantastic to a greater or lesser degree."

In the introduction to the earlier book, he had distinguished "supernatural horror" and "heroic fantasy" as the other important divisions of fantastic fiction beside science fiction. They may be represented by Dracula and The Lord of the Rings, featuring "the irruption of some supernatural force into the everyday world" and "set in completely imaginary worlds" respectively. Here he adds "the Fabulation, or absurdist metafiction—stories which are set in the real world, but which distort that world in ways other than the supernaturally horrific." He names Thomas Pynchon, Angela Carter, John Crowley, and Geoff Ryman as authors of fabulations included in his hundred.

While covering no foreign-language fantasies and few children's or 'light' fantasies, "I have tried to make a balanced list, and in so doing I have included some books which are not really to my taste—they may well be other people's favourites, though. In truth, there are not a hundred masterpieces of modern fantasy, any more than there a hundred masterpieces of science fiction." "[A]t least some of the novels I have selected are masterpieces of modern literature, full of beauty and wonder. The others are craftsmanlike entertainments which I happily commend to you for your enjoyment."

References

Sources
Modern Fantasy: The 100 Best Novels, An English-Language Selection, 1946–1987, David Pringle. (UK) Grafton Books, 1988  ; (US) Peter Bedrick Books, 1989  —US title "the Hundred Best"

External links
 at WorldsWithoutEnd.com —linked contents with front cover images 

Science fiction studies
Lists of novels
1988 non-fiction books
Books about books
Top book lists
 
Lists of fantasy books
Grafton (publisher) books